Brinkmann coordinates are a particular coordinate system for a spacetime belonging to the family of pp-wave metrics.  They are named for Hans Brinkmann. In terms of these coordinates, the metric tensor can be written as

where , the coordinate vector field dual to the covector field , is a null vector field.  Indeed, geometrically speaking, it is a null geodesic congruence with vanishing optical scalars.  Physically speaking, it serves as the wave vector defining the direction of propagation for the pp-wave.

The coordinate vector fields  are both spacelike vector fields. Each surface  can be thought of as a wavefront.

In discussions of exact solutions to the Einstein field equation, many authors fail to specify the intended range of the coordinate variables .  Here we should take

to allow for the possibility that the pp-wave develops a null curvature singularity.

References

Coordinate charts in general relativity